Qurt Tappeh (also Romanized as Qūrt Tappeh; also known as Qūr Tappeh) is a village in Dasht Rural District, in the Central District of Meshgin Shahr County, Ardabil Province, Iran. At the 2006 census, its population was 1,447, in 317 families.

References 

Towns and villages in Meshgin Shahr County